Avolasca is a comune (municipality) in the Province of Alessandria in the Italian region Piedmont, located about  southeast of Turin and about  southeast of Alessandria.  
 
Avolasca borders the following municipalities: Casasco, Castellania Coppi, Costa Vescovato, Garbagna, Montegioco, and Montemarzino.

History 
It appears with the toponyms Audelassum, Audelascum or Audelasci since the Longobard era among the possessions of the Abbey of San Colombano di Bobbio, included in the territory of the monastic court of Casasco. In the Middle Ages Avolasca belonged first to the committee and then to the episcopate of Tortona. Only later it was enfeoffed to several Genoese families and followed the events of the Grue valley.

References

Cities and towns in Piedmont
Articles which contain graphical timelines